Philalethes (Greek: φιλαλήθης, philaléthēs, pronounced [filalétɛːs]) was an Ancient Greek name, also often adopted in pseudonyms (based on its literal translation, "lover of truth"). It may apply to:

 Philalethes, book by Severus of Antioch
 Alazonomastix Philalethes, pseudonym of Henry More
 Alexander Philalethes
 Demosthenes Philalethes
 Eirenaeus Philalethes, alchemical writer, now usually identified with George Starkey
 Eugenius Philalethes, alchemical writer, now usually identified with Thomas Vaughan (philosopher)
 Irenaeus Philalethes, pseudonym of Lewis Du Moulin
 Philalethes Cantabrigiensis, pseudonym of James Jurin
 Philalethes, pen-name of William Hazlitt
 Philalethes, pseudonym of John of Saxony as translator of Dante's Divine Comedy
 Philalethes, pen-name of Henry Portsmouth, author of an index to William Penn's works (1730)

See also
Philalethes Society, Masonic organization